The 2018–19 UEFA Futsal Champions League was the 33rd edition of Europe's premier club futsal tournament, and the 18th edition organized by UEFA. It was also the first edition since the tournament was rebranded from "UEFA Futsal Cup" to "UEFA Futsal Champions League". The final tournament took place at the Almaty Arena in Almaty, Kazakhstan on 26–28 April 2019.

Two-time defending champions Inter FS were unable to defend their title as they succumbed 5–3 to Sporting CP in the semi-finals. Appearing in their third consecutive final, Sporting CP defeated final tournament hosts Kairat 2–1 to claim their first title in the competition. Barcelona beat Inter FS 3–1 to finish in the third place.

Association team allocation
The format remained the same as the previous season, as the top three-ranked associations according to the UEFA Futsal National Team coefficient rankings can enter two teams. The title holders qualified automatically, and thus their association could also enter a second team. If the title holders were from the top three-ranked associations, the fourth-ranked association can also enter two teams. All other associations could enter one team (the winners of their regular top domestic futsal league, or in special circumstances, the runners-up).

Association ranking
For this season, the associations were allocated places according to the coefficient ranking of their men's senior national teams, calculated based on the following:
UEFA Futsal Euro 2016 final tournament and qualifying competition
2016 FIFA Futsal World Cup final tournament and qualifying competition
UEFA Futsal Euro 2018 final tournament and qualifying competition

Since the winners of the 2017–18 UEFA Futsal Cup, Inter FS, were from the top three-ranked associations, the fourth-ranked association could also enter two teams. As a result, Spain, Portugal, Russia and Kazakhstan entered two teams.

Notes
TH – Additional berth for title holders
NR – No rank (association did not enter in any of the competitions used for computing coefficients)
DNE – Did not enter

Distribution
Following expansion of the tournament, the top-ranked teams no longer receive byes to the elite round, and the number of teams in the main round is increased from 24 to 32. Teams are ranked according to their UEFA club coefficients, computed based on results of the last three seasons, to decide on the round they enter:
The title holders and the teams ranked 1–22 or 23 (depending on the number of entries) enter the main round, divided into Path A and Path B.
Path A contains the title holders and the teams ranked 1–11 and 16–19, and the 16 teams are drawn into four groups of four. The top three teams of each group advance to the elite round.
Path B contains the teams ranked 12–15 and 20–22 or 23, and together with the preliminary round qualifiers (8 or 9 teams), the 16 teams are drawn into four groups of four. The winners of each group advance to the elite round.
The remaining lowest-ranked teams enter the preliminary round, and are drawn into groups of three or four. The winners of each group and possibly one or more best runners-up advance to main round Path B.

The elite round remains to be contested by 16 teams (twelve teams from Path A and four teams from Path B), drawn into four groups of four, where the group winners and runners-up from main round Path A are seeded into the top two pots and kept apart if they are from the same group. The winners of each group advance to the final tournament, which is played in the same knockout format between four teams as before.

Teams
A record total of 57 teams from 53 associations entered this season's competition. Two associations had no league as of 2017–18 (Faroe Islands, Liechtenstein).

The 23 highest-ranked teams entered the main round, while the 34 lowest-ranked teams entered the preliminary round. The coefficient ranking was also used for seeding in the preliminary round and main round draws, where each team was assigned a seeding position according to their ranking for the respective draw. Nine teams were pre-selected as hosts for the preliminary round and eight teams were pre-selected as hosts for the main round.

The draws for the preliminary round and main round were held on 5 July 2018, 14:15 CEST (UTC+2), at the UEFA headquarters in Nyon, Switzerland. The mechanism of the draws for each round is as follows:
In the preliminary round, the 34 teams were drawn into nine groups: seven groups of four containing one team from each of the seeding positions 1–4, and two groups of three containing one team from each of the seeding positions 1–3. First, the nine teams which were pre-selected as hosts were drawn from their own designated pot and allocated to their respective group as per their seeding positions. Next, the remaining 25 teams were drawn from their respective pot which were allocated according to their seeding positions.
In the main round Path B, the 16 teams were drawn into four groups of four, containing one team from each of the seeding positions 1–4. First, the four teams which were pre-selected as hosts were drawn from their own designated pot and allocated to their respective group as per their seeding positions. Next, the remaining 12 teams were drawn from their respective pot which were allocated according to their seeding positions (including the nine preliminary round winners, whose identity was not known at the time of the draw, which were allocated to first seeding position 4, then seeding position 3, then seeding position 2). Based on the decisions taken by the UEFA Emergency Panel, should a team from Armenia advance from the preliminary round and qualify for a main round group with a team from Azerbaijan, they would be swapped with the preliminary round group winner in seeding position 4 of the next main round group.
In the main round Path A, the 16 teams were drawn into four groups of four, containing one team from each of the seeding positions 1–4. First, the four teams which were pre-selected as hosts were drawn from their own designated pot and allocated to their respective group as per their seeding positions. Next, the remaining 12 teams were drawn from their respective pot which were allocated according to their seeding positions. Teams from the same association could be drawn into the same group. Based on the decisions taken by the UEFA Emergency Panel, teams from Russia and Ukraine would not be drawn into the same group.

Legend
TH: Futsal Cup title holders
CH: National champions
RU: National runners-up
(H): Preliminary and main round hosts

Notes

Format
In the preliminary round, main round, and elite round, each group was played as a round-robin mini-tournament at the pre-selected hosts.

In the final tournament, the four qualified teams played in knockout format (semi-finals, third place match, and final), either at a host selected by UEFA from one of the teams, or at a neutral venue if none of the teams wished to host.

Tiebreakers
In the preliminary round, main round, and elite round, teams were ranked according to points (3 points for a win, 1 point for a draw, 0 points for a loss), and if tied on points, the following tiebreaking criteria were applied, in the order given, to determine the rankings (Regulations Articles 14.01 and 14.02):
Points in head-to-head matches among tied teams;
Goal difference in head-to-head matches among tied teams;
Goals scored in head-to-head matches among tied teams;
If more than two teams are tied, and after applying all head-to-head criteria above, a subset of teams are still tied, all head-to-head criteria above are reapplied exclusively to this subset of teams;
Goal difference in all group matches;
Goals scored in all group matches;
Penalty shoot-out if only two teams have the same number of points, and they met in the last round of the group and are tied after applying all criteria above (not used if more than two teams have the same number of points, or if their rankings are not relevant for qualification for the next stage);
Disciplinary points (red card = 3 points, yellow card = 1 point, expulsion for two yellow cards in one match = 3 points);
UEFA club coefficient;
Drawing of lots.

Schedule
The schedule of the competition is as follows.

In the preliminary round, main round and elite round, the schedule of each group is as follows, with one rest day between matchdays 2 and 3 for four-team groups, and no rest days for three-team groups (Regulations Articles 19.04, 19.05 and 19.06):

Note: For scheduling, the hosts are considered as Team 1, while the visiting teams are considered as Team 2, Team 3, and Team 4 according to their coefficient rankings.

Preliminary round
The winners of each group advance to the main round Path B to join the seven teams which receive byes (another 16 teams receive byes to the main round Path A).

Times are CEST (UTC+2), as listed by UEFA (local times, if different, are in parentheses).

Group A

Group B

Group C

Group D

Group E

Group F

Group G

Group H

Group I

Main round
Times are CEST (UTC+2), as listed by UEFA (local times, if different, are in parentheses).

Path A
The top three teams of each group in Path A advance to the elite round.

Group 1

Group 2

Group 3

Group 4

Path B
The winners of each group in Path B advance to the elite round.

Group 5

Group 6

Group 7

Group 8

Elite round
The draw for the elite round was held on 12 October 2018, 14:00 CEST (UTC+2), at the UEFA headquarters in Nyon, Switzerland. The 16 teams were drawn into four groups of four, containing one Path A group winners (seeding position 1), one Path A group runners-up (seeding position 2), and two teams which were either Path A group third-placed teams or Path B group winners (seeding positions 3 or 4). First, the four teams which were pre-selected as hosts (marked by (H) below) were drawn from their own designated pot and allocated to their respective group as per their seeding positions. Next, the remaining 12 teams were drawn from their respective pot which were allocated according to their seeding positions (teams, including hosts, which were neither Path A group winners nor runners-up were allocated to first seeding position 4, then seeding position 3). Winners and runners-up from the same Path A group could not be drawn in the same group, but third-placed teams could be drawn in the same group as winners or runners-up from the same Path A group. Teams from the same association could be drawn against each other.

The winners of each group advance to the final tournament.

Times are CET (UTC+1), as listed by UEFA (local times, if different, are in parentheses).

Group A

Group B

Group C

Group D

Final tournament
The hosts of the final tournament were selected from the four qualified teams. Kairat were chosen as hosts at the UEFA Executive Committee meeting in Dublin, Republic of Ireland on 3 December 2018, with the final tournament taking place at the Almaty Arena in Almaty, Kazakhstan, on 26 and 28 April 2019.

Qualified teams
In the following table, all final tournaments were in the Futsal Cup era. Only final tournaments in four-team format starting from 2007 are shown.

Notes

Final draw
The draw for the final tournament was held on 1 February 2019, at half-time of the Kazakhstan v Croatia friendly (kick-off 19:30 local time), at the Baluan Sholak Sports Palace in Almaty. The four teams were drawn into two semi-finals without any restrictions.

Bracket
In the semi-finals and final, extra time and penalty shoot-out were used to decide the winner if necessary; however, no extra time was used in the third place match (Regulations Article 17.01 and 17.02).

Times are CEST (UTC+2), as listed by UEFA (local times are in parentheses).

Semi-finals

Third place match

Final

Top goalscorers
Preliminary round: 
Main round: 
Elite round: 
Final tournament:

References

External links

European league standings

2018-19
Champions League
August 2018 sports events in Europe
September 2018 sports events in Europe
October 2018 sports events in Europe
November 2018 sports events in Europe
April 2019 sports events in Europe